The Sons of the Serpent are a supervillain group appearing in American comic books published by Marvel Comics.

Publication history
The Sons of the Serpent first appeared in The Avengers #32 (Sept 1966) and were created by Stan Lee and Don Heck.

Fictional team history
The Sons of the Serpent are a subversive organization of costumed American racist super-patriots who oppose all racial, ethnic, and religious minorities. They sought to subvert the United States through hate crimes and organized protests, and were opposed by the Avengers and the Defenders. There have been many incarnations of the Sons of the Serpent.

Sons of the Serpent I
The first group calling itself the Sons of the Serpent first appeared in Avengers #32. They were secretly led by General Chen, an agent of Communist China. They attack black scientist Bill Foster who is working with Pym, meaning he tells the Avengers to investigate them. As the Supreme Serpent, Chen attempted to control the Avengers by holding Captain America hostage and making a member impersonate him. Hawkeye infiltrates the Sons when they launch a recruiting drive.

Sons of the Serpent II
The second Sons of the Serpent first appeared in Avengers #73. They were led by racist television demagogues Dan Dunn and Montague Hale, and targeted the African hero Black Panther.

Sons of the Serpent III
The third Sons of the Serpent first appeared in Defenders #22. They were financed through J.C. Pennysworth of Richmond Enterprises (Nighthawk's company) who was an African-American posing as a white racist in pursuit of power.

A sub-group of Serpent was featured in a back-up story in the nineteenth Avengers annual. Hubie Green is a young boy who idolizes the Avengers and dreams of being a super-hero. He gets the chance in a way he does not enjoy; he must turn his brother, the Serpent leader, over to the Avengers in order to save several cities from nuclear destruction.

Sons of the Serpent IV
The fourth Sons of the Serpent first appeared in Avengers Annual 2000 led by Russell Diabola, a demonic Serpent Man. This incarnation of the group became more involved in mysticism, including references to Set.

Sons of the Serpent V
Another incarnation of The Sons of the Serpent appear in the miniseries The Last Defenders, led by an unidentified Supreme Serpent. They held a meeting in Dulwich, London, which was broken up by MI:5 working with Spitfire and Union Jack.

Sons of the Serpent VI
The Sons of the Serpents made a cameo in Runaways #10 (May 2009). In a game of truth or dare, Karolina Dean is dared to steal the Supreme Serpent's coiled staff. She does, and Nico Minoru inadvertently cracks the coiled staff with a spell from her own staff.

Sons of the Serpent VII
The group returns when Daredevil finds one of Matt Murdock's childhood bullies, Nate Hackett, facing charges of a previous association with the group, that Murdock determines he is innocent of. When he gets to the courtroom, however, he finds that the judge is a member of the Sons of the Serpent, determined to find out what Nate knows, and then kill him. Daredevil is able to foil the plot, and learns that the Sons of the Serpent have infiltrated a good portion of the New York City justice system. Following this, they take advantage of a racially motivated murder trial, and, using help from the Jester, try to start race riots in New York City.

Other versions

MC2
In the alternate future of MC2, an offshoot organization called the Soldiers of the Serpent appeared in A-Next.

References

External links
 Sons of the Serpent at Marvel Wiki
 Sons of the Serpent at Comic Vine
 
 

Fictional organizations in Marvel Comics
Marvel Comics supervillain teams